Kushtil is a rural locality (a selo) in Khivsky District, Republic of Dagestan, Russia. The population was 966 as of 2010.

Geography 
Kushtil is located 11 km north of Khiv (the district's administrative centre) by road. Chuvek is the nearest rural locality.

References 

Rural localities in Khivsky District